Association Sportive Tiga Sport is a football club of New Caledonia, competing in the New Caledonia Super Ligue. Its colors are red and white.

Stadium

The current Tiga Sport stadium is the Stade Numa Daly, in the city of Nouméa, with a capacity for 9,646 spectators.

Honours

Domestic
New Caledonia Super Ligue
Champions:(2): 2020, 2022.

Players

Among the team's players are: 21-year-old defender Josué Wélépane, also 35-year-old defender Kenji Vendegou and 34-year-old midfielder Joël Wakanumuné.

References

Football clubs in New Caledonia